Sheffield Forgemasters is a heavy engineering firm located in Sheffield, South Yorkshire, England. The company specialises in the production of large bespoke steel castings and forgings, as well as standard rolls, ingots and bars. The company was nationalised in July 2021, becoming wholly owned by the UK's Ministry of Defence.

History

Origins
Sheffield Forgemasters traces its origins to a 1750s blacksmith forge, and then Naylor Vickers and Co. founded by George Naylor and Edward Vickers, the predecessor of Vickers Limited. Vickers built the River Don Works in 1865. In 1983, the River Don Works, then part of state-owned British Steel, merged with Firth Brown Steels to create Sheffield Forgemasters.

Early years
In the 1980s, Forgemasters manufactured components for the Iraqi Project Babylon "supergun", which it had believed were for a petrochemical refinery. The British investigation exonerated the company's directors, and the incident became known as the Supergun affair.

In 1998, the company was divided and sold to American companies. Allegheny Teledyne bought the aerospace business. Atchison Casting Corp bought the River Don and Rolls businesses, which retained the Sheffield Forgemasters name. Forgemasters was threatened with liquidation in 2002. Atchison went bankrupt in 2003 and was acquired by KPS. In 2005, Graham Honeyman led a successful effort to buy Forgemasters; Honeyman became the company's chief executive and majority shareholder.

Forgemasters experienced a work stoppage from severe flooding in the summer of 2007 when the works were inundated by the River Don. Three weeks after the event, repairs were ahead of schedule and the works were approaching full production.

Civil nuclear market
In the late-2000s, Forgemasters made a failed attempt to acquire a 15,000 tonne forging press for manufacturing ultra-large civil nuclear components. In March 2010, the company had secured £140 million in funding over two years, including an £80 million loan from the British government. Plans to acquire the press were ultimately suspended. The government loan was cancelled in June 2010 with a change of government. Forgemasters declined to apply for a new loan in 2011 as foreign competitors were building such presses, and the Fukushima Daiichi nuclear disaster had caused uncertainty in the civil nuclear market.

Financial difficulties
Forgemasters suffered as the British steel industry declined in the early 2010s. It reported its first operating loss, of £9.4 million, since separating from Atchison in the 14 months leading to December 2014. In January 2016, the company announced plans to reduce its workforce from 800 to 700. The company's financial health attracted attention due to its involvement in Britain's nuclear submarine programme.

In 2016, Forgemasters obtained a £30 million loan from US bank Wells Fargo. The loan was underwritten by nuclear submarine contractors BAE Systems, Babcock International and Rolls-Royce Marine Power, in an arrangement negotiated by the British Ministry of Defence (MoD); the intervention forestalled Chinese investment and control in the company. In March 2018, the arrangement was due to expire in July 2019; Sky News reported that the underwriters were seeking a replacement to Honeyman, possibly as a precondition for renewal. In July 2018, Honeyman was replaced as chief executive by David Bond from BAE Systems.

Nationalisaton
In December 2020, the Ministry of Defence (MoD) and Forgemasters were in preliminary talks for the nationalisation of the company. In July 2021, the UK government announced that the MoD had launched an offer to take over the company for £2.56 million, and intended to invest a further £400 million over the next decade to support defence outputs. Investment will include a new heavy forge line and flood alleviation measures. The current senior management will run the company with two new non-executive directors.

Capabilities
The company specialises in forged and cast steel components for the defence, engineering, nuclear, offshore, petrochemical and steel processing industries worldwide.

The company has the American Society of Mechanical Engineers N-stamp accreditation for critical nuclear components, having produced major components for the s and the civil nuclear industry, including Sizewell B, the UK's only pressurised water reactor.

Sheffield Forgemasters currently has the capacity for pouring the largest single casting (570 tonnes) in Europe.  The two forging presses in use can exert a pressure of 4,500 tonnes and 10,000 tonnes on a billet of steel.  The 4,500 tonne press was installed in 2010 to replace a 1,500 tonne press which dated back to 1897 and was originally steam powered, and after several upgrades became hydraulically operated.

References

External links 

Manufacturing companies established in 1805
Engineering companies of the United Kingdom
Manufacturing companies based in Sheffield
Steel companies of the United Kingdom
1805 establishments in England
British companies established in 1805
Government-owned companies of England